Stian [pronounce: Steejjań] is a given name for males, originating from Norway. It is the modern form of the Old Norse name Stígandr, which means "wanderer". Another translation given is "swift on his feet".

Another modern derivation of the Old Norse is the name Stig.

Notable men named Stian include:

Stian Aarstad, pianist
Stian Arnesen, black metal musician
Stian Barsnes Simonsen, actor
Stian Berget, footballer
Stian Carstensen, jazz and folk musician
Stian Eckhoff, biathlete
Stian Grimseth, weightlifter
Stian Hole, graphic designer and children's author
Stian Kvarstad, ski jumper
Stian Lind Halvorsen, football defender
Stian Kristoffersen, Pagan's Mind drummer
Stian Ohr, football midfielder
Stian Ringstad, football defender
Stian Sivertzen, snowboarder
Stian Theting, football defender
Stian Thoresen, musician
Stian Vatne, handball player
Stian Westerhus, jazz guitarist
Stian Heimlund Skjæveland, figurative painter

References

Norwegian masculine given names